Robotique Majestique is a third studio album by Ghostland Observatory released on February 29, 2008 under Thomas Ross Turner's label, Trashy Moped Recordings. The track Club Soda appeared on the game The Sims 2

Track listing
 "Opening Credits"
 "Heavy Heart"
 "No Place for Me"
 "Freeheart Lover"
 "Dancing on my Grave"
 "Robotique Majestique"
 "The Band Marches On"
 "Holy Ghost White Noise"
 "HFM"
 "Club Soda"

References

2008 albums
Ghostland Observatory albums